Burlington is a historic plantation house located near Aylett, King William County, Virginia.  The main house is a two-part structure consisting of the Classical Revival-style main portion, erected in 1842, and a fragment of a Colonial-period frame dwelling serving as the rear ell.  The main section is a two-story, stuccoed brick dwelling with a standing seam metal gable roof.  The earlier portion is topped by a hipped roof.  Also on the property are the contributing old smokehouse, an early framed barn, and a family cemetery surrounded by a brick wall.

It was listed on the National Register of Historic Places in 1978.

References

Plantation houses in Virginia
Houses on the National Register of Historic Places in Virginia
Neoclassical architecture in Virginia
Colonial architecture in Virginia
Houses completed in 1842
Houses in King William County, Virginia
National Register of Historic Places in King William County, Virginia